Through the Fire is the sixteenth studio album by American singer Peabo Bryson. It was released by Columbia Records on June 14, 1994, in the United States and marked Bryson's first full-length album after the release of his number-one hit duets "Beauty and the Beast" (1991) and "A Whole New World" (1992). The singer reteamed with David Foster, Walter Afanasieff, and Dwight Watkins and consulted upcoming producers Keith Rawls, Keith Thomas and Marc Freeman to work with him on the majority of Through the Fire which was titled after Bryson's cover of the Foster-penned Chaka Khan song (1984).

Critical reception

Billboard called Through the Fire "a strong new set that dishes up the greatest hits, plus a few that someday may be. Among the new tunes are Diane Warren-penned first single “Why Goodbye” and Bryson originals "Same Ol' Love," a sultry delight, and sax-spiced "Spanish Eyes."

Track listing

Personnel and credits 
Musicians

 Peabo Bryson – lead vocals, backing vocals (6), synthesizers (7, 12), arrangements (7, 11, 12)
 Keith Thomas – synthesizers (1, 3), bass programming (1, 3), drums (1), percussion (1), arrangements (1, 3), BGV arrangements (1, 3), drum programming (3)
 Walter Afanasieff – keyboards (2, 8, 9), synthesizers (2, 8, 9), bass (2, 8, 9), rhythm programming (2, 8, 9), Synclavier programming (2), arrangements (2, 8, 9), drums (8), Synclavier (9), acoustic guitar (9), orchestra arrangements (9)
 Gary Cirimelli – Macintosh programming (2), Synclavier programming (2, 8), Akai programming (8)
 Ren Klyce – Akai programming (2, 9), Synclavier programming (2, 9)
 Dan Shea – additional programming (2), keyboards (8), programming (8), Macintosh programming (9)
 Robbie Buchanan – additional arrangements (2), additional keyboards (6), synthesizers (6), programming (6), arrangements (9)
 Mark Portmann – synthesizer programming (4), drum programming (4)
 Randy Kerber – keyboards (5, 10)
 Claude Gaudette – additional synthesizers (5)
 David Foster – arrangements (5, 6, 10), string arrangements (5, 10), keyboards (6)
 Dwight Watkins – keyboards (7, 11, 12), bass (7, 11), backing vocals (7, 12), arrangements (7, 12)
 Simon Franglen – additional synthesizers (10)
 Keith Rawls – keyboards (11), arrangements (11)
 Dann Huff – guitar (1)
 Michael Landau – guitar (2)
 Michael Thompson – guitar (4, 5, 6, 8, 10)
 Eric Brice – guitar (11)
 Nathan East – bass (4)
 Neil Stubenhaus – bass (5, 10)
 Mark Hammond – drums (1), percussion (1), drum programming (3)
 Jay Oliver – drums (1), percussion (1)
 John Robinson – drums (5, 10)
 Marc Freeman – drum programming (6), Akai programming (7, 11, 12), Roland DM-800 (7, 11, 12)
 Jeff Lorber – drum loops (6)
 Denis Solee – soprano saxophone (1)
 David Boruff – saxophone (6)
 Michael Hoskin – saxophone (7)
 Kenny G – soprano saxophone (8), saxophone (11)
 Joel Peskin – electronic oboe (9)
 Emanuel Officer – BGV arrangements (1)
 William Ross – string arrangements (4, 5, 10)
 Jeremy Lubbock – string arrangements (6)
 Billy Gaines – backing vocals (1, 3)
 Trey Lorenz – backing vocals (1, 3), BGV arrangements (3)
 Chris Rodriguez – backing vocals (1, 3)
 Chris Willis – backing vocals (1, 3)
 Regina Belle – lead vocals (2)
 Alex Brown – backing vocals (5, 6)
 Carmen Carter – backing vocals (5)
 Warren Wiebe – backing vocals (5)
 September Gray – backing vocals (6, 7, 11, 12)
 Katrina Perkins – backing vocals (6)
 Regina Troupe – backing vocals (6, 7, 11, 12)
 Yvonne Williams – backing vocals (6)
 Lynn Davis – backing vocals (8)
 Jim Gilstrap – backing vocals (8)
 Portia Griffin – backing vocals (8)
 Pat Hawk – backing vocals (8)
 Phillip Ingram – backing vocals (8)
 Vann Johnson – backing vocals (8)
 Rose Stone – backing vocals (8)
 Fred White – backing vocals (8)
 Celine Dion – lead vocals (9)
 Maryline Blackburn – backing vocals (11)
 Gigi Allen – backing vocals (12)

Production

 Todd Moore – production coordinator (1, 3)
 Cord Himmelstein – production coordinator (4)
 Barbara Stout – production coordinator (9)
 Danny Capes – production coordinator (11)
 Bill Whittington – recording (1, 3), mixing (1, 3)
 Dana Jon Chappelle – engineer (2, 8, 9), mixing (2, 9)
 Ed Goodreau – recording (4)
 Alex Rodriguez – recording (4), assistant engineer (6)
 Chris Trevett – recording (4), mixing (7, 12)
 Humberto Gatica – mixing (4, 6), engineer (5, 6, 10)
 David Reitzas – engineer (5, 6, 10)
 Mick Guzauski – mixing (5, 8, 10)
 Thom Kidd – overdub recording (6), overdub mixing (6)
 David Norman – engineer (7, 11, 12)
 Barney Perkins – mixing (11)
 Shawn McLean – assistant engineer (1, 3)
 Greg Parker – assistant engineer (1, 3)
 Kyle Bess – second engineer (2, 9)
 Manny LaCarrubba – second engineer (2, 9)
 Jen Monnar – second engineer (2)
 Mike Alvord – assistant engineer (3)
 Craig Block – assistant engineer (4), mix assistant (6)
 Thom Cadley – assistant engineer (4)
 Mike Klostner – assistant engineer (4)
 Brian Soucy – assistant engineer (4)
 Felipe Elgueta – additional engineer (5, 10), engineer (6)
 Jeff Graham – mix assistant (5, 10)
 Marc Freeman – additional overdub recording (6)
 Bradshaw Leigh – additional recording (7, 11, 12)
 Kevin Becka – additional engineer (8), assistant engineer (8)
 David Gleason – additional engineer (8)
 Steve Sheppard – additional engineer (8), assistant engineer (8)
 Jeffrey "Woody" Woodruff – additional engineer (8)
 Matthew Lamonica – second engineer (9)
 David Betancourt – assistant engineer (11)
 Greg Calbi – mastering 
 Janet Weber – project coordinator 
 Tony Sellari – art direction, design 
 E.J. Camp – photography 
 David Franklin – management

Studios

 Recorded at Record Plant and Studio G (Los Angeles, CA); Sunset Sound (Hollywood, CA); The Plant (Sausalito, CA); Ground Control Studios and Devonshire Sound Studios (Burbank, CA); Chartmaker Studios (Malibu, CA); Bosstown Recording Studios, Musiplex and Studio LaCoCo (Atlanta, GA); The Bennett House (Franklin, TN); The Power Station and Right Track Recording (New York, NY).
 Mixed at Record Plant and Studio G; Encore Studios (Burbank, CA); The Bennett House; Right Track Recording and Battery Studios (New York, NY).
 Mastered at Sterling Sound (New York, NY).

Charts

References 

1994 albums
Peabo Bryson albums
Columbia Records albums